The Roca dels Moros or Caves of El Cogul is a rock shelter containing paintings of prehistoric Levantine rock art and Iberian schematic art. The site is in El Cogul, in the autonomous community of  Catalonia, Spain. Since 1998 the paintings have been protected as part of the Rock art of the Iberian Mediterranean Basin, a UNESCO World Heritage Site. Inscriptions in Northeastern Iberian script and in Latin alphabet indicate that the place was used as a sanctuary into Iberian and Roman times.

Location, discovery
The paintings were discovered in 1908 by the el Cogul village rector, Ramon Huguet, and a report was published in the same year. Since 1998 the paintings have been protected as part of a UNESCO World Heritage Site (reference 874). Inscriptions in Northeastern Iberian script and in Latin alphabet, one of which is an ex-voto, indicate that the use of the caves as a sanctuary extended to Iberian and Roman times.

The Dancers of Cogul

At Roca dels Moros there are forty-five figures depicted, of which thirty-eight are painted bright red, black and dark red, seven are engraved in stone. A dance scene is the most famous of the painting. This scene is interpreted as nine women (something new in Spanish caves' painting at the age). The figures, believed to be women, are painted in black and others in red. They  dance around what it looks to be a small/short black male figure/figurine at the center right of the composition with an abnormally large phallus, 'but  also has anatomical oddities in its lower limbs that can throw the identification into doubt.' Along with the figures of the women, there are several animals.

Currently, different interpretations have been given as an alternative to the dancers with the purpose of celebrating a mere reproductive ceremony. These can perfectly be women with certain social status gathering to socialize, with their children in a meeting place. These women show friendship and affection toward each other.

Conservation
Conservation work has been carried out on the paintings under the auspices of the Museu d'Arqueologia de Catalunya. There is now a visitors centre to interpret the site and to promote Cogul in the context of a "route of rock art", linking it to similar sites in Catalonia.

The Saladar tombs 
Near the paintings is a cemetery with tombs carved into the rock called Saladar tombs.

References

Bibliography
 Volume I of the Història de Catalunya directed by Pierre Vilar: Prehistòria i història antiga, Joan Maluquer de Motes.
  Anna Alonso Tejada, Alexandre Grimal Navarro (2007): L´Art Rupestre del Cogul. Primeres Imatges Humanes a Catalunya, Pagès Editors, Lleida, .
 Alexandre GRIMAL, Anna ALONSO (2007): Catálogo de Cataluña, Cuenca, Albacete, Guadalajara y Andalucía ("Catalogue of Catalonia, Cuenca, Albacete, Guadalajara and Andalucia") from Catálogo del Arte Rupestre Prehistórico de la Península Ibérica y de la España Insular. Arte Levantino ("Catalogue of prehistoric rock art of the Iberian Peninsula and the Spanish Islands. Levantine Art"), Real Academia de Cultura Valenciana, Archaeological Series, nº 22, Valencia, I-II Vols, pp. 113–252 (Vol I), pp. 41–85 (Vol II). .
  Anna ALONSO TEJADA, Alexandre GRIMAL (2003): L´art rupestre prehistòric a la comarca de les Garrigues, III Trobada d´Estudiosos de la Comarca de les Garrigues, Ajuntament de Cervià de les Garrigues (Lleida), pp. 17–25.

External links
 Les pintures i grabats del Cogul, Archaeology Museum of Catalonia - Catalan Institute of Human Paleoecology and Social Evolution
 Department of Culture of the Generalitat of Catalonia

Prehistoric sites in Spain
Archaeological sites in Catalonia
Rock art of the Iberian Mediterranean Basin
World Heritage Sites in Spain
Rock shelters
Caves of Spain